Skulduggery is a role-playing game by Robin D. Laws, published by Pelgrane Press in 2010.

Description
Skulduggery uses a variant of the system from The Dying Earth Roleplaying Game.

Publication history
Skulduggery was published by Pelgrane Press in 2010.

Reception

References

British role-playing games
Pelgrane Press games
Robin Laws games
Role-playing games introduced in 2010